Show Me How is the ninth studio album by American country music artist Lorrie Morgan. It was released by Image Entertainment on January 20, 2004. Its first single, "Do You Still Want to Buy Me That Drink (Frank)," peaked at #50 on the Billboard Hot Country Singles & Tracks chart. The album peaked at #49 on the Top Country Albums chart.

Track listing
"Do You Still Wanna Buy Me That Drink (Frank)" (Roxie Dean, Buffy Lawson, Patrick Matthews) – 3:31
"Used" (Bekka Bramlett, James House, James T. Slater) – 3:52
"Bombshell" (Louise Dorsey, Lawson) – 2:46
"I Can Count on You" (Craig Carothers, Angela Kaset) – 4:19
"Show Me How" (Gordon Kennedy, Wayne Kirkpatrick, Jessica Simpson) – 3:36
"Us Girls" (Amy Dalley, Kaset, Lee Thomas Miller) – 3:15
"The Wedding" (Kaset, J. Fred Knobloch) – 3:15
"One Less Monkey" (Kaset, Kim Patton-Johnston) – 3:29
"Charlie and Betty" (Lorrie Morgan) – 2:56
"Another Winter Without You" (Eddie Alexander, Marty Morgan) – 4:13
"Rocks" (Marv Green, Chris Lindsey, Aimee Mayo) – 3:52

Personnel

 Susan Ashton – background vocals
 Michael Black – background vocals
 Bekka Bramlett – background vocals
 Chris Bushong – assistant engineer, congas
 Larry Byrom – acoustic guitar
 Chip Davis – background vocals
 Kim Fleming – background vocals
 Paul Franklin – steel guitar
 Tony Green – engineer, mixing
 Vicki Hampton – background vocals
 Aubrey Haynie – fiddle, mandolin
 Mitch Humphries – piano
 John Barlow Jarvis – piano
 Chuck Jones – photography
 Gordon Kennedy – electric guitar

 Alison Krauss – background vocals
 Richard Landis – bass guitar, liner notes, percussion, electric piano, producer, synthesizer
 Paul Leim – drums
 Brent Mason – electric guitar
 Blair Masters – synthesizer
 Lorrie Morgan – lead vocals
 Jimmy Nichols – synthesizer
 Dave Pomeroy – bas dessus 
 John Wesley Ryles – background vocals
 Lisa Silver – background vocals
 Rhonda Vincent – background vocals
 Cindy Richardson-Walker – background vocals
 Dennis Wilson – background vocals

Chart performance

References

2004 albums
Lorrie Morgan albums
Image Entertainment albums
Albums produced by Richard Landis